PRA Health Sciences was a contract research organization (CRO) with headquarters in Raleigh, North Carolina. It was established in 1976 and acquired by ICON in 2021.

Background
PRA was founded as the Anti-Inflammatory Drug Study Group in 1976, renamed PRA in 1982, as it expanded into other therapeutic areas besides inflammation. 
In 2013 the company was acquired by Kohlberg Kravis Roberts, which brought the company public in November 2014 and maintained shares until September 2019. In August 2017, the company acquired Conshohocken-based real-world healthcare data, analytics, and technology solutions company Symphony Health for US$530 million. PRA's 2018 revenue was US$2.87 billion. PRA was acquired by ICON PLC on 1 July 2021.

References

External links 
 Official website

American companies established in 1976
Companies based in Raleigh, North Carolina
Contract research organizations
Companies formerly listed on the Nasdaq
2021 mergers and acquisitions